Markus Leoson, born 1970 in Linköping, Sweden, is a percussionist, cimbalom player and pedagogue.

Markus Leoson began 1986 at the Royal College of Music in Stockholm. In 1990 he was taken on
as a percussionist with the Royal Opera Orchestra and was employed there as solo timpanist three
years later. In between he was solo timpanist at the Danish Radio Symphony Orchestra. After his first
prize at the Swedish Soloist Prize 1995 his solo career accelerated with engagements with several
European orchestras, recitals and CD-recordings. 2008 he was appointed professor at the FRANZ
LISZT Hochschule für Musik in Weimar, Germany. He has premiered around 60 pieces by international composers of which most
of them were dedicated to him.

Discography (selection)

Percussion (Caprice 21466); Marimbolino (nosag CD 059); Markussion (nosag CD 071); Malletiana
(Caprice 21743); Colludo (nosag CD 129)

The compositions by Leoson are published by Norsk Musikforlag.

Honours (selection)
1st Prize the Soloistprize, Stockholm (1995); 2nd Prize in the Nordic Soloist Competition, Reykjavik (1995); Artist in Residence at the Swedish Radio (1996–97);

1st Prize at the EBU IFYP Competition, Bratislava (1997); 2nd Prize at the ARD Competition, Munich (1997)

External links
 Markus Leoson´s website (http://www.markusleoson.com/)
 Prof. Markus Leoson - The Liszt School of Music Weimar

Swedish percussionists
1970 births
Living people